Štáblovice is a municipality and village in Opava District in the Moravian-Silesian Region of the Czech Republic. It has about 700 inhabitants. The village of Lipina within the municipality has well preserved folk architecture and is protected by law as a village monument reservation.

Administrative parts
The village of Lipina is an administrative part of Štáblovice.

History
The first written mention of Štáblovice is from 1389. The village was founded between 1245 and 1281.

Sights

The main landmark is the Štáblovice Castle. A fortress in Štáblovice was first mentioned in 1528. It was rebuilt in the Renaissance style in the second half of the 16th century and then baroque rebuilt in the second half of the 17th century. Today it is privately owned.

The Church of Saint Lawrence was built in 1603. The church building was replaced by a new one in 1854–1855, only the tower has been preserved.

References

External links

Villages in Opava District